Clathrate hydrates, or gas hydrates, clathrates, hydrates, etc., are crystalline water-based solids physically resembling ice, in which small non-polar molecules (typically gases) or polar molecules with large hydrophobic moieties are trapped inside "cages" of hydrogen bonded, frozen water molecules. In other words, clathrate hydrates are clathrate compounds in which the host molecule is water and the guest molecule is typically a gas or liquid. Without the support of the trapped molecules, the lattice structure of hydrate clathrates would collapse into conventional ice crystal structure or liquid water. Clathrate hydrates are not officially chemical compounds, as the enclathrated guest molecules are never bonded to the lattice. The formation and decomposition of clathrate hydrates are first order phase transitions, not chemical reactions. Their detailed formation and decomposition mechanisms on a molecular level are still not well understood.
Clathrate hydrates were first documented in 1810 by Sir Humphry Davy who found that water was a primary component of what was earlier thought to be solidified chlorine.

Clathrates have been found to occur naturally in large quantities. Around 6.4 trillion (6.4×1012) tonnes of methane is trapped in deposits of methane clathrate on the deep ocean floor. Such deposits can be found on the Norwegian continental shelf in the northern headwall flank of the Storegga Slide. Clathrates can also exist as permafrost, as at the Mallik gas hydrate site in the Mackenzie Delta of northwestern Canadian Arctic. These natural gas hydrates are seen as a potentially vast energy resource and several countries have dedicated national programs to develop this energy resource. Clathrate hydrate has also been of great interest as technology enabler for many applications like seawater desalination, gas storage, carbon dioxide capture & storage, cooling medium for data centre and district cooling etc. Hydrocarbon clathrates cause problems for the petroleum industry, because they can form inside gas pipelines, often resulting in obstructions. Deep sea deposition of carbon dioxide clathrate has been proposed as a method to remove this greenhouse gas from the atmosphere and control climate change. Clathrates are suspected to occur in large quantities on some outer planets, moons and trans-Neptunian objects, binding gas at fairly high temperatures.

Structure

Gas hydrates usually form two crystallographic cubic structures: structure (Type) I (named sI) and structure (Type) II (named sII) of space groups   and  respectively. A third hexagonal structure of space group  may also be observed (Type H).

The unit cell of Type I consists of 46 water molecules, forming two types of cages – small and large. The unit cell contains two small cages and six large ones. The small cage has the shape of a pentagonal dodecahedron (512) (which is not a regular dodecahedron) and the large one that of a tetradecahedron, specifically a hexagonal truncated trapezohedron (51262).  Together, they form a version of the Weaire–Phelan structure. Typical guests forming Type I hydrates are CO2 in carbon dioxide clathrate and CH4 in methane clathrate.

The unit cell of Type II consists of 136 water molecules, again forming two types of cages – small and large. In this case there are sixteen small cages and eight large ones in the unit cell.  The small cage again has the shape of a pentagonal dodecahedron (512), but the large one is a hexadecahedron (51264). Type II hydrates are formed by gases like O2 and N2.

The unit cell of Type H consists of 34 water molecules, forming three types of cages – two small ones of different types, and one "huge". In this case, the unit cell consists of three small cages of type 512, two small ones of type 435663 and one huge of type 51268. The formation of Type H requires the cooperation of two guest gases (large and small) to be stable. It is the large cavity that allows structure H hydrates to fit in large molecules (e.g. butane, hydrocarbons), given the presence of other smaller help gases to fill and support the remaining cavities. Structure H hydrates were suggested to exist in the Gulf of Mexico. Thermogenically-produced supplies of heavy hydrocarbons are common there.

Hydrates in the universe

Iro et al., trying to interpret the nitrogen deficiency in comets, stated most of the conditions for hydrate formation in the protoplanetary nebulae, surrounding the pre-main and main sequence stars were fulfilled, despite the rapid grain growth to meter scale. The key was to provide enough microscopic ice particles exposed to a gaseous environment. Observations of the radiometric continuum of circumstellar discs around -Tauri and Herbig Ae/Be stars suggest massive dust disks consisting of millimeter-sized grains, which disappear after several million years (e.g.,). A lot of work on detecting water ices in the Universe was done on the Infrared Space Observatory (ISO). For instance, broad emission bands of water ice at 43 and 60 μm were found in the disk of the isolated Herbig Ae/Be star HD 100546 in Musca. The one at 43 μm is much weaker than the one at 60 μm, which means the water ice, is located in the outer parts of the disk at temperatures below 50 K. There is also another broad ice feature between 87 and 90 μm, which is very similar to the one in NGC 6302 (the Bug or Butterfly nebula in Scorpius). Crystalline ices were also detected in the proto-planetary disks of ε-Eridani and the isolated Fe star HD 142527 in Lupus. 90% of the ice in the latter was found crystalline at temperature around 50 K. HST demonstrated that relatively old circumstellar disks, as the one around the 5-million-year-old B9.5Ve Herbig Ae/Be star HD 141569A, are dusty. Li & Lunine found water ice there. Knowing the ices usually exist at the outer parts of the proto-planetary nebulae, Hersant et al. proposed an interpretation of the volatile enrichment, observed in the four giant planets of the Solar System, with respect to the Solar abundances. They assumed the volatiles had been trapped in the form of hydrates and incorporated in the planetesimals flying in the protoplanets’ feeding zones.

Kieffer et al. (2006) hypothesized that the geyser activity in the south polar region of Saturn's moon Enceladus originates from clathrate hydrates, where carbon dioxide, methane, and nitrogen are released when exposed to the vacuum of space through the "Tiger Stripe" fractures found in that area. However, subsequent analysis of plume material makes it more likely that the geysers on Enceladus derive from a salty subsurface ocean.

Carbon dioxide clathrate is believed to play a major role in different processes on Mars.  Hydrogen clathrate is likely to form in condensation nebulae for gas giants.

Kamata et al.(2019) of the University of Hokkaido have proposed that a thin layer of clathrate hydrates thermally insulates the subsurface ocean of liquid water of Pluto, the existence of which is suggested by data from the New Horizons probe.

Hydrates on Earth

Natural gas hydrates

Naturally on Earth gas hydrates can be found on the seabed, in ocean sediments, in deep lake sediments (e.g. Lake Baikal), as well as in the permafrost regions. The amount of methane potentially trapped in natural methane hydrate deposits may be significant (1015 to 1017 cubic metres), which makes them of major interest as a potential energy resource. Catastrophic release of methane from the decomposition of such deposits may lead to a global climate change, referred to as the "clathrate gun hypothesis", because CH4 is a more potent greenhouse gas than CO2 (see Atmospheric methane). The fast decomposition of such deposits is considered a geohazard, due to its potential to trigger landslides, earthquakes  and tsunamis. However, natural gas hydrates do not contain only methane but also other hydrocarbon gases, as well as H2S and CO2. Air hydrates are frequently observed in polar ice samples.

Pingos are common structures in permafrost regions. Similar structures are found in deep water related to methane leakages. Significantly, gas hydrates can even be formed in the absence of a liquid phase. Under that situation, water is dissolved in gas or in liquid hydrocarbon phase.

In 2017, both Japan and China announced that attempts at large-scale resource extraction of methane hydrates from under the seafloor were successful.  However, commercial-scale production remains years away.

The 2020 Research Fronts report identified gas hydrate accumulation and mining technology as one of the top 10 research fronts in the geosciences.

Gas hydrates in pipelines
Thermodynamic conditions favouring hydrate formation are often found in pipelines. This is highly undesirable, because the clathrate crystals might agglomerate and plug the line and cause flow assurance failure and damage valves and instrumentation. The results can range from flow reduction to equipment damage.

Hydrate formation, prevention and mitigation philosophy
Hydrates have a strong tendency to agglomerate and to adhere to the pipe wall and thereby plug the pipeline. Once formed, they can be decomposed by increasing the temperature and/or decreasing the pressure. Even under these conditions, the clathrate dissociation is a slow process.

Therefore, preventing hydrate formation appears to be the key to the problem. A hydrate prevention philosophy could typically be based on three levels of security, listed in order of priority:
 Avoid operational conditions that might cause formation of hydrates by depressing the hydrate formation temperature using glycol dehydration;
 Temporarily change operating conditions in order to avoid hydrate formation;
 Prevent formation of hydrates by addition of chemicals that (a) shift the hydrate equilibrium conditions towards lower temperatures and higher pressures or (b) increase hydrate formation time (inhibitors)

The actual philosophy would depend on operational circumstances such as pressure, temperature, type of flow (gas, liquid, presences of water etc.)

Hydrate inhibitors
When operating within a set of parameters where hydrates could be formed, there are still ways to avoid their formation. Altering the gas composition by adding chemicals can lower the hydrate formation temperature and/or delay their formation. Two options generally exist:
 Thermodynamic inhibitors
 Kinetic inhibitors/anti-agglomerants

The most common thermodynamic inhibitors are methanol, monoethylene glycol (MEG), and diethylene glycol (DEG), commonly referred to as glycol. All may be recovered and recirculated, but the economics of methanol recovery is not favourable in most cases. MEG is preferred over DEG for applications where the temperature is expected to be −10 °C or lower due to high viscosity at low temperatures. Triethylene glycol (TEG) has too low vapour pressure to be suited as an inhibitor injected into a gas stream. More methanol is lost in the gas phase when compared to MEG or DEG.

The use of kinetic inhibitors and anti-agglomerants in actual field operations is a new and evolving technology. It requires extensive tests and optimisation to the actual system. While kinetic inhibitors work by slowing down the kinetics of the nucleation, anti-agglomerants do not stop the nucleation, but stop the agglomeration (sticking together) of gas hydrate crystals.  These two kinds of inhibitors are also known as low dosage hydrate inhibitors, because they require much smaller concentrations than the conventional thermodynamic inhibitors.  Kinetic inhibitors, which do not require water and hydrocarbon mixture to be effective, are usually polymers or copolymers and anti-agglomerants (requires water and hydrocarbon mixture) are polymers or zwitterionic — usually ammonium and COOH — surfactants being both attracted to hydrates and hydrocarbons.

Empty clathrate hydrates
Empty clathrate hydrates are thermodynamically unstable (guest molecules are of paramount importance to stabilize these structures) with respect to ice, and as such their study using experimental techniques is greatly limited to very specific formation conditions; however, their mechanical stability renders theoretical and computer simulation methods the ideal choice to address their thermodynamic properties. Starting from very cold samples (110–145 K), Falenty et al. degassed Ne-sII clathrates for several hours using vacuum pumping to obtain a so-called ice XVI, while employing neutron diffraction to observe that (i) the empty sII hydrate structure decomposes at T ≥ 145 K and, furthermore, (ii) the empty hydrate shows a negative thermal expansion at T < 55 K, and it is mechanically more stable and has a larger lattice constant at low temperatures than the Ne-filled analogue. The existence of such a porous ice had been theoretically predicted before. From a theoretical perspective, empty hydrates can be probed using Molecular Dynamics or Monte Carlo techniques. Conde et al. used empty hydrates and a fully atomic description of the solid lattice to estimate the phase diagram of H2O at negative pressures and T ≤ 300 K, and obtain the differences in chemical potentials between ice Ih and the empty hydrates, central to the van der Waals−Platteeuw theory. Jacobson et al. performed simulations using a monoatomic (coarse-grained) model developed for H2O that is capable of capturing the tetrahedral symmetry of hydrates. Their calculations revealed that, under 1 atm pressure, sI and sII empty hydrates are metastable regarding the ice phases up to their melting temperatures, T=245 ± 2 K and T=252 ± 2 K, respectively. Matsui et al. employed molecular dynamics to perform a thorough and systematic study of several ice polymorphs, namely space fullerene ices, zeolitic ices, and aeroices, and interpreted their relative stability in terms of geometrical considerations.

The thermodynamics of metastable empty sI clathrate hydrates have been probed over broad temperature and pressure ranges, 100 ≤ T (K) ≤ 220 and 1 ≤ p (bar) ≤ 5000, by Cruz et al. using large-scale simulations and compared with experimental data at 1 bar. The whole p−V−T surface obtained was fitted by the universal form of the Parsafar and Mason equation of state with an accuracy of 99.7–99.9%. Framework deformation caused by applied temperature followed a parabolic law, and there is a critical temperature above which the isobaric thermal expansion becomes negative, ranging from 194.7 K at 1 bar to 166.2 K at 5000 bar. Response to the applied (p, T) field was analyzed in terms of angle and distance descriptors of a classical tetrahedral structure and observed to occur essentially by means of angular alteration for (p, T) > (2000 bar, 200 K). The length of the hydrogen bonds responsible for framework integrity was insensitive to the thermodynamic conditions and its average value is r(̅O H) = 0.25 nm.

CO2 Hydrate
Clathrate hydrate, which encaged CO2 as guest molecule is termed as CO2 hydrate. The term CO2 hydrates are more commonly used these days with its relevance in anthropogenic CO2 capture and sequestration. A nonstoichiometric compound, carbon dioxide hydrate, is composed of hydrogen-bonded water molecules arranged in ice-like frameworks that are occupied by molecules with appropriate sizes and regions. In structure I, the CO2 hydrate crystallizes as one of two cubic hydrates composed of 46 H2O molecules (or D2O) and eight CO2 molecules occupying both large cavities (tetrakaidecahedral) and small cavities (pentagonal dodecahedral). Researchers believed that oceans and permafrost have immense potential to capture anthropogenic CO2 in the form CO2 hydrates. The utilization of additives to shift the CO2 hydrate equilibrium curve in phase diagram towards higher temperature and lower pressures is still under scrutiny to make extensive large-scale storage of CO2 viable in shallower subsea depths.

See also
 Clathrate
 Star formation and evolution
 Clathrate gun hypothesis

References

Further reading

External links

 Gas hydrates, from Leibniz Institute of Marine Sciences, Kiel (IFM-GEOMAR)
 The SUGAR Project (Submarine Gas Hydrate Reservoirs), from Leibniz Institute of Marine Sciences, Kiel (IFM-GEOMAR)
 Gas hydrates in video and – Background knowledge about gas hydrates, their prevention and removal (by manufacturer of hydrate autoclaves)

 
Ice
Gases
Industrial gases
Natural gas